Lancelot Crosbie (1723 – August 1780) was an Anglo-Irish politician.

He was the son of Maurice Crosbie of Ballykealy and Catherine Sandes. He lived at Tubrid House, Ardfert, County Kerry. He entered the Middle Temple in 1743.

Crosbie served in the Irish House of Commons as the Member of Parliament for Kerry between 1759 and 1760. He then represented Ardfert from 1762 to 1776,  with the backing of his first wife's family, the Crosbies.

His first wife was Hon. Elizabeth Crosbie, daughter of Maurice Crosbie, 1st Baron Brandon and Lady Elizabeth Fitzmaurice. The couple were distant cousins. They had no children. By his second wife Mary Blennerhassett, daughter of Colonel John Blennerhassett and Jane Denny, he was the father of three children, including John Gustavus Crosbie. John, like his father, was MP for Kerry. In 1794 he caused a scandal by killing the sitting MP, Sir Barry Denny, 2nd Baronet, in a duel. His own sudden death three years later was widely rumoured to be a revenge killing by the Dennys.

References

1723 births
1780 deaths
18th-century Anglo-Irish people
Lancelot
Irish MPs 1727–1760
Irish MPs 1761–1768
Irish MPs 1769–1776
Members of the Parliament of Ireland (pre-1801) for County Kerry constituencies
Members of the Middle Temple